My Fair Lady is a 1956 Broadway musical. 

My Fair Lady may also refer to:

 My Fair Lady (Shelly Manne album), a 1956 album by Shelly Manne & His Friends consisting of jazz versions of songs from the musical
 My Fair Lady (1958 TV series), a 1958 Australian TV series
 My Fair Lady (Oscar Peterson Trio album), another album
 My Fair Lady (film), a 1964 film adaptation of the musical
 My Fair Lady (2003 TV series), a 2003 South Korean TV drama series
 My Fair Lady (2009 TV series), a 2009 South Korean TV drama series
 The Singaporean name of the manga series The Wallflower
 A phrase in the nursery rhyme London Bridge Is Falling Down
 "My Fare Lady", an episode of The Simpsons
 a cultivar of Mandevilla sanderi, also called Dipladenia sanderi and Brazilian jasmine
 My Fair Lady (2016 TV series), a 2016 South Korean TV drama series
 "My Fair Lady", a song by of Montreal from their 2016 album Innocence Reaches